Dennis Brown (birth unknown), also known by the nickname of "Brown Bomber", is a Welsh rugby union and professional rugby league footballer who played in the 1960s and 1970s. Dennis Brown served in the Royal Marines.

Playing career

International honours
Dennis Brown won a cap for Wales (RL) while at Widnes in 1969.

County Cup Final appearances
Dennis Brown played , i.e. number 2, in Widnes 8–15 defeat by Wigan in the 1971 Lancashire County Cup Final during the 1970–71 season at Knowsley Road, St. Helens on Saturday 28 August 1971.

Club career
Dennis Brown played for Widnes under the pseudonym of A. Newman to protect his amateur rugby union status, although he subsequently appeared under his own name, his Widnes appearances were restricted by his duties serving in the Royal Marines.

References

External links
Statistics at rugby.widnes.tv

Living people
20th-century Royal Marines personnel
Black British sportspeople
Place of birth missing (living people)
Royal Marines ranks
Rugby league wingers
Rugby union wings
Wales national rugby league team players
Welsh rugby league players
Welsh rugby union players
Widnes Vikings players
Year of birth missing (living people)